Jan Janssen (born 1940) is a Dutch road bicycle racer.

Jan Janssen may also refer to:

Jan Janssen (gymnast) (1885–1953), Dutch Olympic gymnast
Jan Janssen (ice hockey) (born 1952), former ice hockey player

See also
Jan Jansen (disambiguation)
Jan Jansohn, guitarist
Jan Jansson (disambiguation)